Lachlan Stuart Jones, OAM (born 4 March 1977) is a former Australian Paralympic athlete.  He was born in Melbourne, and has cerebral palsy.  At the 1996 Atlanta Games, he won a gold medal in the Men's 100 m T32 event with a world record time of 0:19.90, for which he received a Medal of the Order of Australia. He also participated without winning any medals at the 2000 Sydney and 2004 Athens Games. In 2000, he received an Australian Sports Medal.

References

External links
Athletics Australia Results

1977 births
Living people
Paralympic athletes of Australia
Paralympic gold medalists for Australia
Athletes (track and field) at the 1996 Summer Paralympics
Athletes (track and field) at the 2000 Summer Paralympics
Athletes (track and field) at the 2004 Summer Paralympics
Recipients of the Medal of the Order of Australia
Recipients of the Australian Sports Medal
Athletes from Melbourne
Cerebral Palsy category Paralympic competitors
Track and field athletes with cerebral palsy
Australian male sprinters
World record holders in Paralympic athletics
Medalists at the 1996 Summer Paralympics
Paralympic medalists in athletics (track and field)
21st-century Australian people